Q'asiri (Aymara for bawler, hispanicized spellings Casiri, Kasiri, Khasiri) may refer to:

 Q'asiri (Larecaja), a mountain the Larecaja Province, La Paz Department, Bolivia
 Q'asiri (Murillo), a mountain the Pedro Domingo Murillo Province, La Paz Department, Bolivia

See also
 Casiri (disambiguation)
 Kasiri, an alcoholic beverage made from cassava